Madeleine of Savoy (1510–1586) was a French court official, Première dame d'honneur to the queen of France, Elisabeth of Austria, from 1570 until 1574.

Life
She was the daughter of René of Savoy and Anne Lascaris.  

She married constable Anne de Montmorency, a leading soldier and politician, whom she married in 1526. After she was widowed in 1567 she served as Première dame d'honneur to the queen of France, Elisabeth of Austria, from 1570 until 1574.
As such responsible for the female courtiers, controlling the budget, purchases, annual account and staff list, daily routine and presentations to the queen.

Madeleine of Savoy was described as an austere and strict Catholic with a deep dislike of the Huguenots, but not as personally involved in politics, though she was a gathering force for her politically active relations and siblings.

Issue
She had twelve children:
François (1530–1579), succeeded his father as duke of Montmorency.
Henri (1534–1614), succeeded his elder brother as duke of Montmorency.
Charles (1537–1612), Admiral of France
Gabriel
Guillaume (died 1594)
Eléonore (died 1557) married François de La Tour d'Auvergne, parents of Henri de La Tour d'Auvergne, Duke of Bouillon
Jeanne (1528–1596), married Louis III de La Trémoille.
Catherine (1532–1624) married Gilbert de Lévis, Duke of Ventadour and had issue; great great grandparents of Anne Geneviève de Lévis;
Marie
Anne
Louise
Madeleine

References

Sources 

 Françoise Kermina, Les Montmorency, grandeur et déclin, Perrin, Paris, 2002.
 Henri de Panisse-Passis, Les comtes de Tende de la maison de Savoie, Librairie Firmin-Didot et Cie, 1889, 386 p

1510 births
1586 deaths
16th-century French people
French ladies-in-waiting
Court of Francis I of France
Court of Charles IX of France